WMOR may refer to:

 WMOR-FM, a radio station (106.1 FM) licensed to serve Morehead, Kentucky
 WMOR, a defunct FM radio station (102.7 FM) serving Chicago, Illinois
 WMOR-TV, a television station (channel 19) licensed to serve Lakeland, Florida
 WMOR (AM), a defunct radio station (1330 AM) formerly licensed to serve Morehead, Kentucky